The Orson Pratt House is a historic house in St. George, Utah. It was built in 1862, before Utah became a state, for Orson Pratt, a mathematician and an original member of the Quorum of the Twelve Apostles of the Church of Jesus Christ of Latter-day Saints. The house was acquired by Richard Bentley in 1864. It has been listed on the National Register of Historic Places since August 11, 1983.

References

		
National Register of Historic Places in Washington County, Utah
Houses completed in 1862
1862 establishments in Utah Territory